Osmanski is a surname. Notable people with the surname include: 

Bill Osmanski (1915–1996), American football player and coach
Joe Osmanski (1917–1993), American football player
Joy Osmanski (born 1975), Korean-American actress

Surnames of Polish origin